Aleksandr Balandin may refer to:

 Aleksandr Balandin (gymnast) (born 1989), Russian gymnast
 Alexander A. Balandin, Russian-American electrical engineer and materials scientist
 Aleksandr Nikolayevich Balandin (born 1953), Russian cosmonaut

See also
Balandin